The 2023 IIHF Women's World Championship will be an international ice hockey tournament organized by the International Ice Hockey Federation (IIHF) which will be contested in Brampton, Canada from 5 to 16 April 2023, at the CAA Centre.

Participants

 – Promoted from the 2022 Division IA

Preliminary round
The groups were based on the final rankings from the previous tournament.

All times are local (UTC−4).

Group A

Group B

Knockout stage
There will be a re-seeding after the quarterfinals.

Bracket

Quarterfinals

5–8th place semifinals

Semifinals

Fifth place game

Third place game

Final

References

External links
Official website

IIHF Women's World Championship
2023 IIHF Women's World Championship
2023 in Canadian sports
2023 in ice hockey
Sport in Brampton
April 2023 sports events in Canada
Ice hockey
IIHF